Oakland, Alabama may refer to:
Oakland, Chambers County, Alabama
Oakland, Lauderdale County, Alabama
Oakland, Limestone County, Alabama, near Athens
Oakland (near Madison), Limestone County, Alabama